Gehyra interstitialis, also known as Oudemans's dtella or Oudemans's four-clawed gecko, is a species of gecko in the genus Gehyra, endemic to western Papua New Guinea.

References

Gehyra
Reptiles described in 1894